Clonbullogue Airfield is a small Irish airport located about  west of Clonbullogue and  south of Edenderry in County Offaly, Ireland. It is owned and operated by the Irish Parachute Club which is based at the field. Six aircraft are based at the field, most of them owned by the Irish Parachute Club.

There is usually busy parachuting at weekends and public holidays so flying restrictions are enforced around this area.

References

External links
 Irish Parachute Club
 Facebook

Airports in the Republic of Ireland